The 1945 Michigan State Normal Hurons football team represented Michigan State Normal College (later renamed Eastern Michigan University) during the 1945 college football season. In their 23rd season under head coach Elton Rynearson, the Hurons compiled an undefeated record of 5–0–1, shut out five of six opponents, including a scoreless tie with Wayne State, defeated Wayne State, 14-13, in a second game, and outscored all opponents by a combined score of 45 to 13. Bernard T. Dyer was the team captain. The team played its home games at Briggs Field on the school's campus in Ypsilanti, Michigan.

Schedule

References

Michigan State Normal
Eastern Michigan Eagles football seasons
College football undefeated seasons
Michigan State Normal Hurons football